Dumoine may refer to:

 Dumoine River, a river in western Quebec, Canada
 Fort Dumoine, a colonial French trading post in Quebec, Canada
 Lac Dumoine, a lake in southern Quebec, Canada.
 Zec Dumoine, a controlled harvesting zone, in southern Quebec, Canada